The Symphony of Monody is a 2005 composition by the Persian composer Mehdi Hosseini, performed and recorded in Saint Petersburg on 3 June 2007 by the Saint Petersburg Academic Symphony Orchestra conducted by Daniel Black. The work is based on folk music material of Lorestan.

References

2005 compositions
Compositions by Mehdi Hosseini
Hosseini